Raichur–Gadwal–Kacheguda DEMU is a train between Raichur in Karnataka and Kacheguda in Andhra Pradesh established in October 2013. The train numbers are 77690/94. It runs between Raichur and Kacheguda via Gadwal, Mahbubnagar and Shamshabad.

The train started after a line between Gadwal and Raichur was laid in October 2013. The line has three new stations at Chandrabanda (halt) in Karnataka, Pandurangaswamy Road (crossing station) and Priyadarshini Jurala Project Road (halt) in Andhra Pradesh.

References

Rail transport in Telangana
Raichur
Rail transport in Karnataka
Diesel–electric multiple units of India